Uckington may refer to:
Uckington, Gloucestershire
Uckington, Shropshire